Maggie Smith (born 1950) is an American ceramist.

Smith was born in New Hampshire, but moved at twenty-seven to Seattle and has resided since 1986 on Bainbridge Island. She runs a ceramics studio but is best known for her public art works, most notably the Salem Witch Trials Memorial and the Oak Grove-Freedman's Cemetery, which were both collaborations with architects. She also worked on realization of the Winslow Way project in Bainbridge. Her work often involves letters.

References

Salem Witch Trials Memorial in photos
 Salem Witch Trials Memorial on Salem Web
 Bainbridge art masterplan, 2003

1950 births
Living people
Artists from New Hampshire
American ceramists
American women ceramists
21st-century American women